Subrahmanyapuram is a 2018 Indian Telugu-language Mystery thriller film starring Sumanth and Eesha Rebba directed by Santosh and produced by Sudhakara Reddy and Dheeraj.

Plot 
This entire film revolves around a young lad Karthiik (Sumanth), who is meant to solve the mystery of a town named Subrahmanyapuram.

Cast 
Sumanth as Karthik
Eesha Rebba as Priya
Sai Kumar as Ayushmaan
Suresh as Varma
Surya
Raghunatha Reddy
Amit Sharma
 Vajja Venkata Giridhar
Bhadram
 Josh Ravi
Harishini

Production 
The director narrated the script to Sumanth in February 2018. Sumanth plays an atheist in the film. This film is Sumanth's 25th film and was launched in March 2018 during the festival of Ugadi. The film was shot in Sriramapuram in East Godavari and Hyderabad. The first look of the film was revealed in July 2018. In August of the same year, around fifty percent of the shooting was completed. Rana Daggubati gave a voice-over for some scenes in the film. The shooting of the film finished in October 2018. The teaser was released during Dussehra in late October. The trailer was released in November. This film was released on 7 Dec 2018.

Soundtrack 
The songs were composed by Shekar Chandra.

"Ee Rojila" is written by  Suresh Banisetti and sung by Anurag Kulkarni and Nutana.
"Friendship" is written by Puranachary and sung by Dhanunjay.
"Saho Shanmukha" is written by Jonnavithula Ramalingeswara Raj and sung by S. P. Balasubrahmanyam.

Reception 
123Telugu gave three out of five stars and wrote that "The intriguing storyline is the main highlight of Subramanyapuram." The Hindu gave the film a mixed review and wrote "Subrahmanyapuram is definitely not what is depicted in the trailer". The Times of India gave the film two-and-a-half out of five stars and wrote that " If there’s something that you will not regret shelling out your hard-earned money for, it’s only Sumanth’s composed performance".

References

External links 

2010s Telugu-language films
Indian mystery thriller films
2010s mystery thriller films
2018 thriller films
Indian mystery films
Films about Hinduism
Films set in Andhra Pradesh
Films shot in Andhra Pradesh
Films shot at Ramoji Film City
Films shot in Hyderabad, India
Films set in Konaseema